Frances Grant (born Stella Theophane Fortier, February 15, 1909 – February 20, 1982) was an American movie actress and dancer. She appeared as the leading lady of Gene Autry in Red River Valley (1936) and Oh, Susanna! (1936) and other B-films such as Thunder Mountain (1935). and Cavalry (1936).

Biography
Frances Grant was born on February 15, 1913, in Roxbury, Massachusetts to Alfred Fortier and Mary Agnes Caples Fortier, one of two daughters.

She acted in stock theater after high school. In the early 1930s, she became the dancing partner of Hal Le Roy in the Ziegfeld Follies of 1931. In 1934, she began her film career with uncredited roles as a dancer in the Kentucky Kernels (1934) and The Nitwits (1935). 
Grant appeared in Doubting Thomas (1935) after having her first major film role in the 1935 Western film Thunder Mountain opposite George O'Brien. In the following year she appeared as the leading lady of Gene Autry in Red River Valley (1936) and Oh, Susanna! (1936). In the latter film, Grant sings a duet with Autry on the song "Water Wheel" with Autry accompanying them on guitar. That same year she had leading roles in Born to Fight with Frankie Darro, The Traitor with Tim McCoy, and Cavalry opposite Bob Steele.

Grant's last leading role was in Rich Relations (1937). She appeared in three additional films as a dancer uncredited. In the 1940s and 1950s, Grant worked as a dance director in films such as Masquerade in Mexico (1945), Mrs. Mike (1949), and Fancy Pants (1950).

Frances Grant died in Lexington, Massachusetts, on February 20, 1982, at the age of 73.

Filmography

 Kentucky Kernels (1934) Kentucky Belle (uncredited) 
 The Nitwits (1935) Hoofer (uncredited) 
 Doubting Thomas (1934) Peggy Burns 
 Thunder Mountain (1935) Nugget 
 The Oregon Trail (1936) Settler Girl (uncredited) 
 Dancing Feet (1936) Dance Hall (uncredited) 
 Red River Valley (1936) Mary Baxter 
 Born to Fight (1936) Nan Howard 
 Oh, Susanna! (1936) Mary Ann Lee 
 The Traitor (1936) Mary Allen 
 Cavalry (1936) Betty Lee Harvey 
 Rich Relations (1937) Nancy Tilton 
 Top of the Town (1937) Dancer (uncredited) 
 Bride by Mistake (1944) Dancing Instructress (uncredited) 
 Gypsy Holiday (Short) (1948) Specialty Dancer 
 Artists and Models (1955) Dancer (uncredited)

Notes

References
 (secondary source only)

External links
  (also compiled from the "information" from Magers)

 (?primary source)

American film actresses
1909 births
1982 deaths
Actresses from Boston
20th-century American actresses